Isla de sa Porassa is located in the bay of the village of Magaluf, Majorca, Spain.

Features 

The island is uninhabited, but visited during the summer season by many holidaymakers, either swimming, on personal water craft or on pedalboat from Magaluf Beach.

References

External links
Isla de sa Porrassa at Map Planet

Islets of Mallorca
Calvià